The Princess Grace Challenge Cup is a rowing event for women's quadruple sculls at the annual Henley Royal Regatta on the Thames at Henley-on-Thames in England. It is open to female crews from all eligible rowing clubs. Two or more clubs may combine to make an entry.

The event is named after Princess Grace of Monaco, who was the Academy Award-winning American actress Grace Kelly. Upon marrying Rainier III, Prince of Monaco in 1956, she became Her Serene Highness The Princess of Monaco, but was generally known as Princess Grace of Monaco. Her father John B. Kelly Sr. was an Olympic rowing gold medal winner, and her brother John B. Kelly Jr. won the Diamond Challenge Sculls at Henley in 1947 and 1949. A year before the Princess's death in 1982 she was invited to and presented the prizes of the Royal Regatta.

The event was incepted in 2001 and the cup was first presented in 2003 by the president of the Australian Olympic Committee John Coates. In 2004, the son of the Royal guest presenter, Prince Albert of Monaco did likewise, as to all prizes.

Results

References

Grace Kelly
Events at Henley Royal Regatta
Rowing trophies and awards